The 1998 Trophée Lalique was the fourth event of six in the 1998–99 ISU Grand Prix of Figure Skating, a senior-level international invitational competition series. It was held at the Palais Omnisports de Paris-Bercy in Paris on November 20–22. Medals were awarded in the disciplines of men's singles, ladies' singles, pair skating, and ice dancing. Skaters earned points toward qualifying for the 1998–99 Grand Prix Final.

Results

Men

Ladies

Pairs

Ice dancing

External links
 1998 Trophée Lalique

Trophée Lalique
Trophée Lalique
International figure skating competitions hosted by France
Internationaux de France